Chatto may refer to the following people:

 Chatto (Apache) (1860–1934), Chiricahua Apache chief
 Andrew Chatto (1840–1913), English book publisher
 Beth Chatto (1923–2018), plantswoman, garden designer and author
 Daniel Chatto (born 1957), British artist and former actor
 Dominic Chatto (born 1985), Nigerian footballer
 Edgar Chatto (born 1960), Filipino politician
 Grace Chatto (born 1985), British musician
 Keith Chatto (1924–1992), Australian comic book artist and writer
 Lady Sarah Chatto (born 1964), Member of the British royal family.
 Tom Chatto (1920–1982), English actor
 Virendranath Chattopadhyaya (1880–1937), Indian Bengali revolutionary
 William Andrew Chatto (1799–1864), English writer, sometimes used the pseudonym Stephen Oliver